Bouli is an animated television series originally produced in France between 1989 until 1991.

Synopsis
The Moon magically brings Bouli the snowman and his snowman friends to life and keeps them from melting.

All the snowmen live in a picturesque village hidden in the woods. Bouli's main goal in life is to be good to others, to help them, to smile and to involve them in a variety of activities and adventures, including sea voyages, skiing, ice skating, cooking, playing music, etc.

Bouli as well as all his friends are lovable and easily identifiable characters for children: the Sailor, the Footballer, the Tennis Player, the Trader, the Cook, the Punk, the Lifeguard, the Grandfather and Bouli's two closest friends: Bouli girl whom he loves, and a big bear who sleeps, snores and eats cakes.

Distribution

TV
The series originally aired in France between 1989 and 1990.
 In Ireland it was broadcast in Irish on the RTÉ Two channel originally from 2 September 1991, and later on the Irish language-specific television channel TnaG (now TG4) in the late 1990s.
 In North Macedonia it was broadcast in the early 1990s.
 In Israel it was broadcast on Channel 1.
 In Brazil it was broadcast on the TV Cultura channel.
 In New Zealand it was broadcast on TV2.
 In Canada it was broadcast on CBC Television as part of their Hodge Podge Lodge block from 1990-1994 and on Treehouse TV in 1997.
In Russia it was broadcast on Karusel.
 In Singapore it was broadcast on Channel 5.
 In Australia it was broadcast on ABC Australia from August 20, 1990 to July 19, 1994.
 In the United Kingdom it was broadcast on the defunct largest children's cable network The Children's Channel.
 In Jordan it was broadcast in its original French language on the French network of JRTV.
 In Saudi Arabia it was broadcast on the country's English language network Saudi 2 with the English dub being screened.
 In Poland it was broadcast on TVP1 in 1990-1992 and 2008-2009 and on TVP Polonia in 2009.
 In the Netherlands it was broadcast in the 1991-1992 season at least.
In Greece it was broadcast on ERT1.
The show was also broadcast in several other countries.

VHS and DVD releases
A French DVD box set of the series was produced in the 2000s. An English DVD release was never made.

References

External links 
 
 Bouli.fr - The official Bouli web-page!

1989 French television series debuts
1991 French television series endings
French children's animated adventure television series
1980s French animated television series
1990s French animated television series
Fictional snowmen
Male characters in animation
TG4 original programming
The Den (TV programme)
TVNZ 2 original programming
Television series by Mattel Creations